Electricity Supply Corporation of Malawi Limited (ESCOM) is the state-owned power transmission and distribution company in Malawi. It is entirely in control of transmission and distribution of electric power in the country. ESCOM represents Malawi in the Southern African Power Pool. It should not be confused with its South African equivalent Eskom.

Location
The headquarters of the company are located in ESCOM House, along Haile Selassie Avenue, in the central business district of Blantyre, the commercial and financial capital of Malawi. The ESCOM House sits directly across the street from Shifa Hospital. The geographical coordinates of the company headquarters are:15°47'16.0"S, 35°00'38.0"E (Latitude:-15.787778; Longitude:35.010556).

Unbundling
When initially created in the 1980s, ESCOM monopolized the functions of (a) generation (b)transmission and (c) distribution of electric power throughout Malawi. In 2015, the government of Malawi began planning the unbundling of the company to allow private investors to enter the Malawian market.

Escom is saddled with low tariffs and payment arrears. The company is heavily indebted and is loss-making. It lacks creditworthiness and is unable to attract private investment into the electricity sector, because power-purchase agreements with Escom are not financially viable. It is unable to upgrade infrastructure and increase generation capacity.

In January 2017, Escom was split into two companies. Electricity Generation Company Malawi Limited (Egenco) is responsible for the operation, maintenance, and improvement of the power stations owned by the Malawian government. At that time, the power stations had generation capacity of 351 megawatts. Escom retained the role of bulk-purchaser, transmission and distribution to the consumer. Escom is also the sole seller to foreign customers.

Governance
Thomson Mpinganjira serves as the chairman of the ten-person board of directors. Mr. Kamkwamba Kumwenda is the Chief Executive Officer. He leads a team of nine senior Directors in running the day-to-day affairs of the company.

See also

List of power stations in Malawi

References

External links
ESCOM Official website

Electric power companies of Malawi
Companies established in 1984
1984 establishments in Malawi
Blantyre District